Jean-Claude Arifon (16 November 1926 – 8 July 2005) was a French hurdler. He competed in the men's 400 metres hurdles at the 1948 Summer Olympics.

References

External links
 

1926 births
2005 deaths
Athletes (track and field) at the 1948 Summer Olympics
French male hurdlers
Olympic athletes of France
Place of birth missing
20th-century French people
21st-century French people